Steady On may refer to:

 Steady On (Shawn Colvin album), a 1989 album by Shawn Colvin
 Steady On (Point of Grace album), a 1998 album by Point of Grace
 The Steady On Tour, a nationwide tour headlined by Point of Grace